= Bharane =

Village in Maharashtra

- Village
- Interactive map of Bharane
- Country: India
- State: Maharashtra

Bharane is a village in Ratnagiri district, Maharashtra state in Western India. The 2011 Census of India recorded a total of 3,336 residents in the village. Bharane's geographical area is approximately 297 hectares (730 acres).
